The Franklin County Career and Technology Center is vocational high school located in Chambersburg, Pennsylvania. It serves Grades 10-12. The program at FCCTC includes half a year of academics and half a year of shop. It has six participating school districts.

Administration
The school is run by a joint operating committee made up of representatives from the participating school districts. One each from Greencastle-Antrim, Shippensburg, and Fannett-Metal; two from Waynesboro, and three from Chambersburg. FCCTC does have its own principal.

Participating school districts
 Chambersburg Area School District
 Waynesboro Area School District
 Tuscarora School District
 Fannett-Metal School District
 Shippensburg Area School District
 Greencastle-Antrim School District

External links

Public high schools in Pennsylvania
Schools in Franklin County, Pennsylvania
Vocational education in the United States